The 2018 Nordic Naturals Challenger was a professional tennis tournament played on hard courts. It was the 31st edition of the tournament which was part of the 2018 ATP Challenger Tour. It took place in Aptos, California, United States between 6 and 12 August 2018.

Singles main-draw entrants

Seeds

 1 Rankings are as of July 30, 2018.

Other entrants
The following players received wildcards into the singles main draw:
  Ulises Blanch
  Brandon Holt
  Michael Mmoh
  Martin Redlicki

The following player received entry into the singles main draw using a protected ranking:
  Illya Marchenko

The following players received entry into the singles main draw using special exempts:
  Joris De Loore
  Stefano Napolitano

The following players received entry from the qualifying draw:
  Marcos Giron
  Luke Saville
  Aleksandar Vukic
  Alexander Ward

Champions

Singles

  Thanasi Kokkinakis def.  Lloyd Harris 6–2, 6–3.

Doubles

  Thanasi Kokkinakis /  Matt Reid def.  Jonny O'Mara /  Joe Salisbury 6–2, 4–6, [10–8].

References

2018 ATP Challenger Tour
2018
2018 in American tennis
2018 in sports in California